Mariana Müller Weickert (born February 17, 1982) is a Brazilian model represented by Ford Models. She was chosen by the German Vogue magazine for a 25-page editorial with major New York stylists. Lately she has been following a career as a TV host.

Biography and career
Mariana is of German descent on both her paternal and maternal lineage and she is among the most sought after models in the country. She reached fame and fortune around the world participating in fashion shows in Paris, Milan, London and New York City. She has worked for brands such as Alexander McQueen, Calvin Klein, Chanel, Ralph Lauren, Gucci, Roberto Cavalli Stella McCartney, Marc Jacobs, Givenchy, Louis Vuitton, Versace, Fendi and Armani. She has been featured in editorials and covers for  W Magazine, The Face, Visionaire, FAB Magazine, English Vogue, and US Vogue, to name a few. In 2001 she was featured in the month of May of the Pirelli calendar, photographed by Mario Testino.
In 2004, Mariana quit her modeling career at the peak and moved back to Brazil; where she pursued a career on TV.

She has hosted programs on MTV Brasil and Network 21.

Currently, she hosts the shows Vamos Combinar and Desafio da Beleza in the cable channel GNT. In 2013 she signed with "Band" to be a host the show A Liga and now Mariana hosts three programs in two different TV stations (GNT and BAND).

TV shows
 2005 - Pé na areia (MTV)
 2005 - Saca-Rolha (Rede 21)
 2008 - GNT Fashion (GNT)
 2011 - Vamos Combinar (GNT)
 2013 - present - A Liga (Band)
 2014 - Desafio da Beleza (GNT)
 2015 - S.O.S - Salvem o Salão (GNT) 
 2015 - Miss Brasil 2015 (Band)

References

External links

1982 births
Living people
People from Blumenau
Brazilian people of German descent
Brazilian female models
Brazilian television presenters
Brazilian models of German descent
Brazilian women television presenters